The Cameroon greenbul (Arizelocichla montana) is a species of the bulbul family of passerine birds. It is found in the Cameroonian Highlands forests. It is becoming rare due to habitat loss.

Taxonomy and systematics
The Cameroon greenbul was originally described in the genus Andropadus and, was re-classified to the new genus Arizelocichla in 2010. Alternatively, some authorities classify the Cameroon greenbul in the genus Pycnonotus. Alternate names for the Cameroon greenbul include Cameroon little greenbul, Cameroon montane greenbul, Cameroon mountain greenbul, montane greenbul and mountain little greenbul. The alternate names mountain bulbul and mountain greenbul should not be confused with the species of the same name (Ixos mcclellandii and Arizelocichla nigriceps respectively). The name 'Cameroon greenbul' is sometimes used as an alternate name for the Slender-billed greenbul.

References

Cameroon greenbul
Birds of Central Africa
Fauna of Cameroon
Cameroon greenbul
Taxonomy articles created by Polbot